The 1942 United States House of Representatives elections were elections for the United States House of Representatives to elect members to serve in the 78th United States Congress. They were held for the most part on November 3, 1942, while Maine held theirs on September 14. This was the first election after the congressional reapportionment based on the 1940 Census, and was held in the middle of President Franklin D. Roosevelt's third term. With involvement in World War II, it was the first wartime election in the United States since 1918.

Roosevelt's Democratic Party lost 45 seats to the Republican Party, retaining only a slender majority even though they lost the popular vote by over 1 million votes (3.9%). This would not occur again until 1952, when the party who won the popular vote did not also win the House majority. This was the most successful congressional election for Republicans since 1930. The main factor that led to the Republican gains during this election cycle was popular dissatisfaction with American involvement in World War II. , this is the last time the House of Representatives was made up of five parties. This was also the smallest House majority that the Democrats had up until the 2020 elections.

Voter turnout was historically low for the time, which was attributed to the absence of military men and the apathy of workers at war production plants, many of whom had failed to re-register to vote in their new communities or become accustomed to local candidates.

Overall results

Source: Election Statistics - Office of the Clerk

Special elections 
Some special elections were held throughout the year.

Elections are listed by date and district.

Alabama

Arizona 

Arizona received a second representative in reapportionment; it continued to elect both representatives at large rather than drawing districts.

Arkansas

California 

Three new seats were added in reapportionment, increasing the delegation from 20 to 23 seats. Two of the new seats were won by Democrats, one by a Republican. One Republican and one Democratic incumbents lost re-election, and one vacancy was won by a Republican. Therefore, both Democrats and Republicans increased by 2 seats.

Colorado

Connecticut

Delaware

Florida 

Florida received a 6th seat in reapportionment; it added an at-large district to its 5 districts rather than redrawing them.

Georgia

Idaho

Illinois 

Illinois was reapportioned from 27 representatives to 26; it went from electing 2 at-large representatives to 1 without redrawing the other districts.

Indiana 

Indiana was redrawn from 12 districts to 11 after reapportionment; most of the districts underwent minor boundary changes, and the old 11th district was divided up, distributing Madison County to the 5th, Hancock County to the 10th, and consolidating the parts of Marion County in the old 11th and Indianapolis-based 12th into a new 11th. This forced incumbents William Larrabee and Raymond S. Springer to run against each other in a district drawn mainly from Springer's old district.

Iowa 

Iowa was redistricted from 9 to 8 districts, with the most substantial changes being merging the 2nd, 3rd, and 4th districts in northeastern Iowa down to 2 districts.

Kansas 

Kansas was reapportioned from 7 districts to 6, with the central Kansas 4th district losing territory on its north and gaining most of the old 5th district around Wichita.

Kentucky

Louisiana

Maine

Maryland

Massachusetts 

Massachusetts was reapportioned from 15 districts down to 14, with the most affected incumbent being Thomas H. Eliot of the former 9th, whose western Boston suburbs were moved into the 10th and 4th while his Cambridge residence was pulled into the more urban 11th, where he was defeated in the primary by James Michael Curley.

Michigan

Minnesota

Mississippi

Missouri

Montana

Nebraska 

Redistricted from 5 districts down to 4; the 4th and 1st districts were merged into each other, with the other three districts all gaining some territory on the south.

Nevada

New Hampshire

New Jersey

New Mexico 

Reapportioned from 1 representative to 2; both of the representatives were elected at large.

New York

North Carolina 

North Carolina was reapportioned from 11 seats to 12, and reorganized the existing 10th and 11th districts (in the mountainous west of the state) into three districts.

North Dakota

Ohio 

Ohio was reapportioned from 24 seats to 23, and removed one of its two at-large seats while leaving the 22 geographical districts unchanged.

Oklahoma

Oregon 

Oregon redistricted from 3 districts to 4 by splitting the old 1st district (the western part of the state except Multnomah County) and putting the southern half (Linn and Lane counties and the counties to the south) into a 4th district.

Pennsylvania 

Pennsylvania was reapportioned from 34 to 33 representatives, and redistricted from 34 to 32 geographical districts with one new at-large district. The Philadelphia-area districts were left pretty much unchanged, with the removal of one district in north-central Pennsylvania and another in Pittsburgh and compensating adjustments to nearby districts.

Rhode Island

South Carolina

South Dakota

Tennessee 

Tennessee was reapportioned from 9 districts to 10, and added an additional district in the central part of the state, allowing Davidson County to have its own district.

Texas

Utah

Vermont

Virginia

Washington

West Virginia

Wisconsin

Wyoming

Non-voting delegates

Alaska Territory

See also
 1942 United States elections
 1942 United States Senate elections
 77th United States Congress
 78th United States Congress

Notes

References

Sources 
 Election Statistics - Office of the Clerk

 
United States home front during World War II